Amaurobius asuncionis is a species of spider in the family Amaurobiidae, found in Paraguay.

References

asuncionis
Spiders of South America
Spiders described in 1946